William Joseph Sutton is an English professional footballer who plays as a defender for  side Oldham Athletic.

Playing career
Sutton made his first-team debut for Oldham Athletic on 10 November 2020, playing the full 90 minutes and scoring an own goal in a 3–1 victory at Bradford City. Manager Harry Kewell said that "he was excellent... he scored his first goal as well, just in the wrong net!"

In January 2023, Sutton joined Radcliffe on a one-month loan deal.

Statistics

References

2002 births
Living people
English footballers
Association football defenders
Oldham Athletic A.F.C. players
Witton Albion F.C. players
Farsley Celtic F.C. players
Radcliffe F.C. players
English Football League players
National League (English football) players
Northern Premier League players